Dehu (also Romanized as Dehū; also known as Dehū’īyeh) is a village in Derakhtengan Rural District, in the Central District of Kerman County, Kerman Province, Iran. At the 2006 census, its population was 26, in 5 families.

References 

Populated places in Kerman County